Pereslavsky (masculine), Pereslavskaya (feminine), or Pereslavskoye (neuter) may refer to:
Pereslavsky District, a district of Yaroslavl Oblast, Russia
Pereslavskoye, a rural locality (a settlement) in Kaliningrad Oblast, Russia